Tapiscia sinensis is a species of plant in the Tapisciaceae family. It is endemic to China.  It is threatened by habitat loss.

References

Flora of China
Tapisciaceae
Vulnerable plants
Taxonomy articles created by Polbot
Taxa named by Daniel Oliver